Toy Shop is a simulation/role-playing video game video game developed by Portuguese team Seed Studios and published by Majesco Entertainment for the Nintendo DS handheld video game console. It is often compared to the Story of Seasons series but with a Toy Shop theme.

It was developed by the Portuguese video games company Seed Studios.

References

External links
Developer website
American Publisher website
European Publisher website

2008 video games
Business simulation games
Majesco Entertainment games
Nintendo DS games
Nintendo DS-only games
Role-playing video games
Video games about toys
Video games developed in Portugal
Single-player video games